Cairn na Burgh Mòr (also Cairnburgh More) is one of the Treshnish Isles in the Inner Hebrides of Scotland.

Cairn na Burgh Mòr is the larger of the two "Carnburgs" (as they are nicknamed) at the northeastern end of the Treshnish Isles in the Inner Hebrides - the other being "Cairn na Burgh Beag". The larger of a pair guards the entrance to Loch Tuath on the west coast of Mull. These grassy islands are both remnants of ancient lava flows, and have a distinctive profile: flat-topped and trimmed with cliffs. Cairn na Burgh Mòr has fortifications on the grassy slope. Cairnburgh Castle and a chapel are located on the isle.

It is no longer inhabited.

Footnotes

Treshnish Isles
Uninhabited islands of Argyll and Bute